Kirksey may refer to:

People
Christian Kirksey (born 1992), American football linebacker
Dianne Kirksey (1950–2020), American filmmaker
Ivy Kirksey (1902–????), American baseball player
Jack Kirksey (born 1928), American politician
Jerry Kirksey (born 1940), American magazine editor
Jon Kirksey (born 1970), American football defensive tackle
Larry Kirksey, American football player and coach
Morris Kirksey (1895–1981), American athlete and rugby player
Roy Kirksey (1947–1981), American football guard
William Kirksey (born 1966), American football linebacker
Kirksey Nix (born 1943), American mobster

Places
James Kirksey Plantation, former plantation in Leon County, Florida
Kirksey, Kentucky, unincorporated community in Calloway County
Loy Kirksey House, historical building in Clark County, Arkansas

Other
Kirksey Architecture, architecture firm headquartered in Houston, Texas
Kirksey v. Kirksey, legal case